KCCP-LP (102.3 FM) is a radio station licensed to South Padre Island, Texas, United States. The station is currently owned by Cameron County Texas.

References

External links
 

CCP-LP
CCP-LP